The Rebellion of the Alpujarras may refer to:

Rebellion of the Alpujarras (1499–1501)
Rebellion of the Alpujarras (1568–1571)